"Here Comes Goodbye" is a song written by American Idol season 6 finalist Chris Sligh and Clint Lagerberg and recorded by American country music group Rascal Flatts, who released it in January 2009 as the first single from their album Unstoppable and the twenty-third single of their career. This song debuted at number 29 on the Billboard Hot Country Songs charts dated for February 7, 2009 and became their 10th number one on the chart dated April 25, 2009. It was nominated for a Grammy Award for "Best Country Performance By A Duo Or Group With Vocals" in 2010.

History
Lagerberg came up with the opening line "I can hear the truck tires coming up the gravel road" after thinking about his childhood home in Maine, which had a long gravel driveway. Sligh then decided to take the line and make it into a song where "something's coming, and it's not good." The opening piano melody came from a melody that Sligh played when Lagerberg was checking on Sligh's daughter, and decided to use it because they thought that it would capture the listener's attention.

Content
"Here Comes Goodbye" is a power ballad beginning with piano accompaniment. The lyric explains the male narrator's realization that his lover is about to leave him. A string section and electric guitar accompaniment backs the song from the second verse onward, and an electric guitar solo precedes the bridge.

Critical reception
The song has received mixed reviews from music critics. Jim Malec of The 9513 gave it a "thumbs down" rating. His review criticized it for "having an overly dramatic production in contrast to its underdeveloped lyrics", which he thought "made the song sound awkward". He describing Gary LeVox' vocals as "atypically restrained andricher and considerably less whiney than usual" in the first verse but said that his delivery became "hilarious in its urgency" as the song progressed. Blake Boldt of Country Universe gave it a C rating, also thinking that LeVox "gracefully handle[d]" the first verse but "tumbl[ed] into operatic tendencies toward the end." He also considered it a "copycat" of the band's 2006 single "What Hurts the Most".

Matt Bjorke of Roughstock gave a more favorable review. Although he referred to the song's structure as a "well-worn power ballad path", he considered LeVox' performance "nuanced" and overall thought that the song was "better than anything on the trio's previous album Still Feels Good."

Music video
The music video was directed by Shaun Silva. The video features a family visiting a graveyard of a lost father. The man is accompanied by a small boy, waiting to take him to heaven, who is revealed to be the daughter's son, whose grave is side by side with her father's. Throughout the video, the band's members are shown singing the song in a snowy backdrop. It was filmed over 3 days: the first day the band was filmed on an LA soundstage; the second and third days were filmed on a snowy ranch property in Park City, Utah. Actress Kadee Strickland from the ABC show Private Practice was cast as the lead female.

Chart performance
Rascal Flatts released "Here Comes Goodbye" to radio on January 20, 2009. It is the group's twenty-third single release overall, and the lead-off single to their sixth studio album, Unstoppable. The song debuted at number 29 on the Billboard Hot Country Songs charts dated for February 7, 2009 and reached number 1 on the chart dated April 25, 2009.  To claim the top spot, "Here Comes Goodbye" jumped 6-1, the biggest climb to Number One since Taylor Swift sent "Our Song" 6-1 on the chart dated December 22, 2007. "Here Comes Goodbye" is also the group's tenth Number One.

Year-end charts

Cover versions
Aaron Kelly covered the song in the top 24 round of the ninth season of American Idol
Season 12 American Idol runner-up Kree Harrison covered the song in the Top 3 round.
Brynn Cartelli covered the song in the Knockout Rounds of the fourteenth season of The Voice.

References

2009 singles
2009 songs
Rascal Flatts songs
Lyric Street Records singles
Country ballads
Music videos directed by Shaun Silva
Song recordings produced by Dann Huff